Albert Mills may refer to:

 Albert Leopold Mills (1854–1916), United States Army Major General 
 Bert Mills (1910–1984), Australian Australian rule footballer
 Bobby Mills (athlete) (1894–1964), British athlete
Mosky Mills (1889–1972), English footballer